James Kerr Kelly (February 16, 1819September 15, 1903) was an American politician born in Pennsylvania. He was a United States senator for Oregon from 1871 to 1877, and later Chief Justice of the Oregon Supreme Court. Prior to his election to the Senate he had been elected to both houses of the local legislature, serving in the Territorial House and State Senate, and was a member of the Oregon Constitutional Convention in 1857.

Early life
Kelly was born in Centre County, Pennsylvania, in 1819. There he attended the school at Milton, and later the Lewisburg Academies. For his higher education, the future Congressman graduated from the College of New Jersey in 1839. James Kelly then studied law in Carlisle, Pennsylvania, at the Dickinson School of Law and was admitted to practice law in Pennsylvania in 1842.

Career
Upon entering the legal profession, Mr. Kelly began private practice in Lewistown, Pennsylvania, then was the deputy attorney general for Mifflin County, Pennsylvania. In 1849 he left for California and the newly discovered gold fields, then moved on to the Oregon Territory in 1851. In Oregon he set up a law practice in Portland and was one of three people selected to help re-write the laws of the territory.

Political career

While living in Oregon, Kelly became active in politics and was elected as a Democrat to the territorial legislature serving from 1853 to 1857, and was selected as president of the legislature twice. In 1857, he was a member of the constitutional convention formed to prepare for Oregon's admission into the Union in 1859. Upon statehood, Kelly was elected to the Oregon State Senate and served from 1860 to 1864. In 1864, he ran for a seat in the U. S. House of Representatives, but lost to Republican James H. D. Henderson. He was also unsuccessful in running for governor in 1866. Then in 1870, he was elected to the U.S. Senate as a Democrat and served from March 4, 1871, to March 3, 1877. He did not run for re-election.

From 1878 to 1880, Kelly was a justice of the Oregon Supreme Court. He also served as chief justice of the court during that time. Kelly was appointed to the position by Governor W. W. Thayer, (along with Justices Reuben P. Boise and Paine Page Prim) as a temporary justice until elections could be held following a reorganization of the Oregon court system. Kelly was not elected to a full term after his partial term expired.

Later life
After retiring from the bench, Kelly went back into private practice in Portland. In 1890 he returned to the east coast, settling in Washington, DC, where he practiced law. James Kerr Kelly died on September 15, 1903, with burial at Rock Creek Cemetery.

References

1819 births
1903 deaths
People from Centre County, Pennsylvania
American people of Irish descent
Democratic Party United States senators from Oregon
Members of the Oregon Territorial Legislature
Members of the Oregon Constitutional Convention
Democratic Party Oregon state senators
Chief Justices of the Oregon Supreme Court
19th-century American politicians
19th-century American judges
Justices of the Oregon Supreme Court